Susquehanna State Park is a Pennsylvania state park on  in Williamsport in Lycoming County, Pennsylvania in the United States. The park is on the West Branch Susquehanna River in the western part of Williamsport, and is operated by the Williamsport / Lycoming Chamber of Commerce in cooperation with the Bureau of State Parks of the Pennsylvania Department of Conservation and Natural Resources. Susquehanna State Park offers cruises on a paddlewheeler, boating, fishing, and picnicking.

History
The park land was originally part of the West Branch Division of the Pennsylvania Canal, which ran along the left bank of the West Branch from Susquehanna River from Northumberland to Lock Haven. The canal was in operation here from October 15, 1834 to July 1, 1889, when a major flood destroyed it.

The Susquehanna Boom was a system of cribs and chained logs in the West Branch Susquehanna River, designed to catch and hold floating timber until it could be processed at one of the nearly 60 sawmills along the river between Lycoming and Loyalsock Creeks in Lycoming County, Pennsylvania in the United States. Susquehanna State Park is located within just a small section of what was once the boom. The Susquehanna Boom was originally built under the supervision of James H. Perkins, and operated from 1851 to 1909, when it shut down for lack of timber.

When flood control levees were built around Williamsport, the park land was left outside the levee system. It was developed as a "riverfront recreational area" by the state and city, opening in 1961. The modern paddlewheeler Hiawatha began excursions here in 1982. In the winter of 2000-2001, the Hiawatha was rebuilt with a new hull at a cost of $200,000.

While the Williamsport / Lycoming Chamber of Commerce operates the park, responsibility for its facilities within the Pennsylvania Department of Conservation and Natural Resources lies with Shikellamy State Park.

Facilities and recreation
Cruises on the paddlewheeler Hiawatha are one of the main attractions at Susquehanna State Park. One-hour-long public cruises are offered on weekends from May to October, as well as weekdays from July to September. The Hiawatha celebrated its twenty-fifth anniversary of excursions in 2006. A variety of special cruises are offered, including: family night, karaoke, Sunday brunch, dinner, and sunset concert cruises. Charters are also available.

The Hiawatha House has souvenirs, snacks, and tickets for cruises. The Hiawatha is run by River Valley Transit, which also operates bus and tourist trolley service in Lycoming County.

The park's boat launch allows access to the river for boating. There is no horsepower limit for motor boats. Canoes, kayaks, rowboats, and other non-powered boats are also allowed. A dam on the West Branch Susquehanna River at Hepburn Street in Williamsport provides  of water deep enough for waterskiing.

Fishing is allowed from the banks of the river and from boats. Common species of fish (both cold and warm water) include catfish, panfish, and smallmouth bass. The laws and regulations of the Pennsylvania Fish and Boat Commission apply.

Picnicking is possible on the picnic tables throughout the park, as well as a pavilion with more tables, which may be reserved.

Nearby state parks
The following state parks are within  of Susquehanna State Park:

Bucktail State Park Natural Area (Cameron and Clinton Counties)
Little Pine State Park (Lycoming County)
McCalls Dam State Park (Centre County)
Milton State Park (Northumberland County)
Ravensburg State Park (Clinton County)
R. B. Winter State Park (Union County)
Sand Bridge State Park (Union County)
Shikellamy State Park (Union and Northumberland Counties)
Upper Pine Bottom State Park (Lycoming County)
Worlds End State Park (Sullivan County)

References

External links

 

Protected areas established in 1961
Susquehanna State Park
State parks of the Appalachians
Parks in Lycoming County, Pennsylvania
Protected areas of Lycoming County, Pennsylvania